Kalonymus Escarpment also called "Twinshaven Escarpment" is a ridge in Sullivan County, New York. It is located east-northeast of Grahamsville. Sugarloaf Mountain is located north-northwest and South Hill is located south-southwest of Kalonymus Escarpment.

References

Mountains of Sullivan County, New York
Mountains of New York (state)